Gachuyeh (also Romanized as Gachūyeh and Gachooyeh; also known as Gachu, Cachūyeh, and Kachūyeh) is a village in Faramarzan Rural District, Jenah District, Bastak County, Hormozgan Province, Iran. At the 2006 census, its population was 891, in 174 families.

References 

Populated places in Bastak County